The Lamborghini V12 refers to the flagship V12 engine used by Lamborghini. Lamborghini has had two generations of V12 engines through their history, both of which were developed in-house. The first-generation Lamborghini V12 was a sixty degree (60°) V12 petrol engine designed by Lamborghini, and was the first internal combustion engine ever produced by the firm.

It entered production in 1963 as a 3.5 litre displacing  fitted on Lamborghini's first car, the Lamborghini 350GT. The engine remained in use for almost fifty years; the final version of 6.5 litre displacement was installed in the Lamborghini Murciélago. Lamborghini discontinued their first-generation V12 after the Murcielago, opting for a brand-new V12 that first saw use on the Lamborghini Aventador.

History

When Ferruccio Lamborghini set out to compete with Ferrari, he contracted Giotto Bizzarrini to design the engine for his car and, according to some accounts, paid him a bonus for every horsepower over what Ferrari's V12 could produce. The finished  V12, with minor improvements, went on to become the 6.5 litre powering the Lamborghini Murciélago LP 640, and completed its service for Lamborghini with the final version of the Murciélago, the Murciélago LP 670-4 SuperVeloce.

Technical overview
The engine was designed from the start to be a quad cam 60 degree V12 - as an intentional snub to Ferrari's single overhead camshaft per-bank design. Bizzarrini insisted the engine was mechanically capable of reaching  at 11,000 rpm with an uprated fuel system, but the design was judged adequate, and when fitted with production carburettors, all the auxiliary systems, and detuned for road use, the engine still made .

It has seen the modification of the cylinder heads to allow four valves per cylinder, the replacement of Weber carburettors with electronic fuel injection, and the re-engineering of the lubrication system from a wet to a dry sump design. However, the engine that powers the Murciélago LP 640 can trace its lineage directly to the F1-inspired design of Bizzarrini and his team more than forty years ago.

Audi ownership and V12 successor

When Automobili Lamborghini was purchased in 1998 by the German Volkswagen Group subsidiary Audi AG, the V12 engine continued undergoing constant upgrades, growing its displacement from 5.7 litres (Diablo VT) to the final displacement of 6.5 litres in the Murciélago LP670-4 Superveloce.
It took years to decide that a new engine was needed to be built from scratch, finally an all-new engine codenamed L539 having a displacement of 6.5 litres for the 2011 Aventador was developed.

Specifications

First generation

engine configuration — 3.5 & 3.9 60° V12 engine; wet sump lubrication system
engine configuration — 6.2 & 6.5 60° V12 engine; dry sump lubrication system
engine displacement etc.
3.9: , bore x stroke: 
4.8: , bore x stroke: 85.5 mm x 69 mm (3.37 in x 2.72 in).
5.2: , bore x stroke: , compression ratio 9.5:1 and downdraft 6X2 barrel Weber carburetors.
5.7: , bore x stroke: 
6.0: , bore x stroke: 
cylinder block & crankcase cast aluminium alloy; pressed-in cylinder liners
cylinder heads & valvetrain — 3.5, 3.9, 4.8 cast aluminium alloy; two valves per cylinder, 24 valves total, chain-driven double overhead camshaft
cylinder heads & valvetrain — 6.2 & 6.5 cast aluminium alloy; 4 valves per cylinder, 48 valves total, chain-driven double overhead camshaft
aspiration, fuel system & ignition system — 3.5 six twin-barrel side-draught 40 DCOE 2 Weber carburetors; one or two ignition distributors
aspiration, fuel system & ignition system — 3.98 six twin-barrel down-draught carburettors; one or two ignition distributors
aspiration, fuel system & ignition system — 6.2 & 6.5 two air filters, four cast alloy throttle bodies each with Magneti Marelli electronically controlled 'drive by wire' throttle butterfly valves, cast magnesium alloy intake manifold; two linked common rail fuel distributor rails, electronic sequential multi-point indirect fuel injection with intake manifold-sited fuel injectors; centrally positioned spark plugs, mapped direct ignition with 12 individual direct-acting single spark coils
exhaust system — 6.2 & 6.5 two 3-branch exhaust manifolds per cylinder bank, connected to dual-inlet catalytic converters, heated oxygen sensors (lambda) monitoring pre- and post-catalyst exhaust gasses

Second generation 
Type: 60° V12 fuel feed by Multi Point Fuel Injection
Displacement: 
Bore x stroke:  
Valvetrain: Variable valve timing electronically controlled
Compression ratio: 11.8  (± 0.2) : 1
Maximum power:  at 8,250 rpm
Maximum torque:  at 5,500 rpm
Emission class: Euro 6 – LEV 2
Emissions control system: Catalytic converters with lambda sensors
Cooling system: Water and oil cooling system in the rear with variable air inlets
Engine management system: Lamborghini Iniezione Elettronica (LIE) with Ion current analysis
Lubrication system: Dry sump
Weight: 235 kg

Formula One

Lamborghini made the move to Formula One in  when the FIA outlawed turbocharged engines. Former Scuderia Ferrari designer / engineer Mauro Forghieri was commissioned to design and build a new, 3.5 litre V12 engine for use by the French Larrousse team in 1989. Lamborghini representatives stated at the engines début race, the 1989 Brazilian Grand Prix in Rio de Janeiro, that they chose a lower ranked team to join Formula One (Larrousse was in its third season using Lola chassis') as it was felt at the early stage of its development the 3512 would not be able to do justice to one of the teams usually closer to the front of the grid. Also, the front running teams already had existing engine suppliers in place (McLaren with Honda, Williams with Renault, Benetton with Ford, and Ferrari who made their own V12 engines).

The Lamborghini V12 did impress many in 1989 despite its unreliability, and the engines best result in its first year came thanks to fast but accident prone Larrousse driver Philippe Alliot when he qualified his Lola LC89 in 5th position for the Spanish Grand Prix at Jerez, only 1.417 seconds slower than the V10 McLaren-Honda of pole winner Ayrton Senna. Alliot then backed up that performance by scoring the engine's first point in Formula One by finishing 6th in the race and setting the 4th fastest race lap in the process. Unfortunately, Alliot's teammate for the second half of 1989, former Ferrari driver Michele Alboreto, never came to grips with either the Lola or the Lamborghini. In his eight races for Larrousse he recorded four DNF's, two failures to pre-qualify, one failure to qualify, and a single 11th-place finish in Portugal.

The Lamborghini V12's best finish came when Larrousse driver Aguri Suzuki finished 3rd in the infamous 1990 Japanese Grand Prix at Suzuka. Its time in Formula One (1989-1993) would prove to be frustrating though as poor reliability became the norm for the engine, despite being used by Grand Prix winning teams such as Lotus and Ligier who could boast driving talent such as Derek Warwick (Lotus - 1990), and Thierry Boutsen (Ligier - 1991). In a 2014 interview, Warwick said of the 3512 that it was "All noise and no go".

In 1993 after four years in Formula One with only one significant result for the engine, Bob Lutz of Lamborghini's parent company Chrysler, did a hand-shake deal with McLaren boss Ron Dennis for the team to test the LE3512 to evaluate its potential as a race winner. McLaren made a modified version of their  race car, the McLaren MP4/8 dubbed the MP4/8B, to test the engine (the test car took three months to modify to fit the longer and heavier V12). Testing was completed by triple World Champion Ayrton Senna, and future dual World Champion Mika Häkkinen at both the Silverstone Circuit in England and the Estoril circuit in Portugal. According to reports, Senna even wanted to race the engine at the Japanese Grand Prix believing that while reliability might be a problem, at least he would be quicker than with the Ford powered race car (ironically Senna would win in both Japan and the last race in Australia with the existing MP4/8). Despite this however, Ron Dennis decided to go with Peugeot V10 engines in  due to a better commercial agreement that would give long term stability to the team and at the end of the 1993 season, the Lamborghini LE3512 was retired from Grand Prix racing after the company was sold by Chrysler to an Indonesian investor group led by Tommy Suharto.

The Lamborghini, which on all cars it powered carried the words "Chrysler powered by Lamborghini" (other than the McLaren MP4/8B which was all virgin white, though the test engines were badged as Chrysler), was one of only five V12 engines used in the naturally aspirated era from 1989–2013, the others being from Ferrari (1989-1995), Honda (1991-1992), Yamaha (1991-1992), and Porsche (1991). The only other 12 cylinder engines in Formula One during this time were disastrous efforts by Life Racing Engines with their W12 engine and Subaru who reintroduced the Flat 12 to the sport, both appearing in the first half of 1990.

LE3512 power output
  - 
  - 
  - 
  - 
  - 
 1993 -  (McLaren tests)

F1 statistics 1989-1993
 Races - 80 (49 starts)
 First Race - 1989 Brazilian Grand Prix at Jacarepaguá
 First Chassis - Larrousse Lola LC88C
 Last Race - 1993 Australian Grand Prix at Adelaide
 Last Chassis - Larrousse LH93
 Wins - 0
 Pole Positions - 0
 Podiums - 1 (3rd - 1990 Japanese Grand Prix at Suzuka, Aguri Suzuki, Larrousse Lola LC90)
 Points - 20
 Teams - Larrousse, Lotus (1990), Ligier, Modena Team (1991), Minardi
 Best Qualifying - 5th, Philippe Alliot, Larrouse Lola LC89, 1989 Spanish Grand Prix at Jerez
 Best Constructors' Championship - 6th, Larrousse, 1990 (11 points)
 Best Drivers' Championship - 12th, Aguri Suzuki, 1990 (6 points)

See also
applications of the V12 engine

Lamborghini 350GT
Lamborghini Miura
Lamborghini Espada
Lamborghini Countach
Lamborghini LM002
Lamborghini Diablo
Lamborghini Murciélago
Lamborghini Aventador
Lamborghini Veneno
Lamborghini Centenario
Lamborghini Essenza SCV12
Lamborghini Sián FKP 37

list of Volkswagen Group petrol engines article
V12 – 6.2/6.5 V12 430-471 kW sub-section of the above article
V10 – 5.2 FSI V10 412 kW sub-section of the above article
V10 – 5.0 V10 368 kW sub-section of the above article

References

External links
Lamborghini.com official website
A Farewell to the Old Lamborghini V12

V12
Gasoline engines by model
V12 engines
Formula One engines